"Hauli Hauli" is a Punjabi song sung by Garry Sandhu and Neha Kakkar originally released as "Yeah Baby" by Garry Sandhu.

Background

Original version 
The single was released on YouTube by Fresh Media Records on 4 May 2018. The song is sung and written by Garry Sandhu.

Recreated version 
It was remade for movie De De Pyaar De as Hauli Hauli by Tanishk Bagchi on Label T-Series.

Personnel

Original version
•Singer- Garry Sandhu 
•Lyrics- Garry Sandhu
•Label- Fresh Media Records

Recreated version
•Singer- Garry Sandhu and Neha Kakkar
•Recreated by- Tanishk Bagchi
•Label- T-Series

Reception

Original version 
The original version was by Garry Sandhu, a well known singer in the industry, and it is famous across country.

Recreated version 
Rakulpreet Singh dance was praised but the recreation was unable to make same impact and song was criticized for its poor recreation.

References 

2018 singles
Neha Kakkar songs
Punjabi-language songs
Indian songs
Hindi film songs
Macaronic songs